Sixth Fleet or 6th fleet may refer to:

 United States Sixth Fleet
 IJN 6th Fleet, Imperial Japanese Navy
 Luftflotte 6

See also
 
 
 
 
 Sixth (disambiguation)
 Fleet (disambiguation)
 Fifth Fleet (disambiguation)
 Seventh Fleet (disambiguation)